Tortricidia pallida, the red-crossed button slug, is a moth of the family Limacodidae described by Gottlieb August Wilhelm Herrich-Schäffer in 1854. It is found in eastern North America from Nova Scotia west to Minnesota and south to Louisiana.

The larvae feed on the leaves of many different types of shrubs and trees including beech, cherry, oak and willow.

References

External links
Bug Guide

Limacodidae
Moths described in 1854
Taxa named by Gottlieb August Wilhelm Herrich-Schäffer
Moths of North America